New Zealand Force South East Asia (NZFORSEA) (1974–1989) comprised the elements of the Royal New Zealand Navy, New Zealand Army and Royal New Zealand Air Force.  Much of the New Zealand military left Singapore as part of operation Kupe in 1989, leaving behind a residual Defence Support Unit (NZDSU).

Background 
Although New Zealand has had a military presence in South East Asia for most of the post WWII period, it was not until the disestablishment of the ANZUK Force in 1974, comprising Australian, New Zealand and United Kingdom military personnel, that New Zealand established a self-supporting national presence in the region.

Formally established on 30 January 1974, NZFORSEA was under the direct command of Ministry of Defence in New Zealand. Although NZFORSEA was based in Singapore, its normal area of operation, the territories of Malaysia and Singapore, was identical with its predecessor, the ANZUK Force.

Administrative arrangements and function

The ANZUK Force operated under the 1971 Five Power Defence Arrangements (FPDA) between Australia, New Zealand, United Kingdom, Singapore and Malaysia. This arrangement provided the framework for NZ FORSEA whose primary role was defined to be:

 Promote stability in the area. 
 Enhance New Zealand's political and diplomatic influence in the region. 
 Assist the development of the Armed Forces of countries in the area. 
 Implement the Mutual Assistance Programme, where the force provided assistance and conducted exercises with armed forces of countries in the area, particularly those of Singapore and Malaysia.

With the Headquarters sited at the Stores Basin area adjacent to the current Sembawang Naval Basin, This was the last major foreign military presence based in Singapore. Total military strength at the time stood at 850 with some 700 dependants.  NZFORSEA took over many of British married quarters, recreational and welfare facilities at Nee Soon, Sembawang and Woodlands.

Units of the NZFORSEA 
NZFORSEA was required to provide its own logistical support as well as a number of services to United Kingdom and Australian forces and comprised the following units during it existence:

NZ Force Headquarters
HQ NZFORSEA was a Tri-service Headquarters unit, commanded by a Brigadier equivalent and provided a headquarters with a nucleus of staff officers and support staff, including
 Personnel Branch
 Operations Branch
 Finance Branch (Finance Advisor and the Civilian Establishment and Pay Office (CEPO))
 Support Branch
 Education Section,
 Photographic Section,
 Communications Centre,
 Pass Issue Office.
NZ Installation Auxiliary Police UnitThe Installations Auxiliary Police Force (IAPF) was a small police force, staffed by Singaporeans but commanded by an NZ officer to provide security to the whole area. 
 Legal Services Office.

ANZMIS
Australian New Zealand Military Intelligence Staff

Royal New Zealand Navy
Although no Royal New Zealand Navy (RNZN) vessels were permanently based at Singapore, there were frequent deployments of RNZN vessels and a good number of individual RNZN personnel were posted to all of the NZFORSEA units

1 RNZIR

Based at Dieppe Barracks, 1st Battalion Royal New Zealand Infantry Regiment (1 RNZIR) was a light infantry battalion with a long history in South East Asia, Originally deployed to South East Asia in 1957, the battalion was first based at Taiping and then Terendak in Malaysia, Nee Soon Camp and Dieppe Barracks in Singapore. In its 32-year history serving in South East Asia, the Battalion had been involved in the Malayan Emergency 1950–1960, the Indonesia–Malaysia Confrontation1963–66 and the Vietnam War 1967–1971.

NZ Transport Squadron

NZ Transport Squadron was responsible for providing Movements, Catering and Transport support the NZFORSEA units. Originally created as E Platoon 10 Transport Coy, Royal New Zealand Army Service Corps(RNZASC) in April 1974 at Dieppe Barracks. In October 1974 it was unofficially renamed 18(NZ) Transport Company, RNZASC and relocated to the Naval Base. In May 1979 it was renamed NZ Transport Squadron Royal New Zealand Corps of Transport (RNZCT)

NZ Advanced Ordnance Depot

From 1974 to 1989 the Royal New Zealand Army Ordnance Corps (RNZAOC) maintained the New Zealand Advanced Ordnance Depot (NZAOD) in Singapore in order to provide Ordnance services to NZFORSEA units.

NZ Work Services Unit
Formed on 1 September 1975, NZ Work Services Unit (NZWSU) primary responsibility was the maintenance and repair of all NZFORSEA buildings and real estate.

NZ Force Hospital
Located at the former Royal Navy Medical Centre Woodlands, the NZ Force hospital provided medical care for NZ servicemen, NZ Civilian staff, dependants and members of visiting forces.

NZ Dental Unit
Formed on 1 May 1974, the NZ Dental Unit provided Dental Services to NZ servicemen, NZ Civilian staff, dependants and members of visiting forces.

NZ MP Unit
A Tri-Service platoon sized unit, The NZ MP unit provided policing support to NZFORSEA.

NZ Workshops
A Royal New Zealand Electrical and Mechanical Engineers (RNZEME) unit, NZ Workshop was established at Kangaw Barracks on 1 October 1974 when the ANZUK Workshop was split into the 28 UK Bde Spt Workshop and NZ workshop NZFORSEA. Progressively moving into the former Royal Navy (MT) Workshop at the Naval Base as Royal Navy withdrew. As much as possible the NZ Workshop provided services on par with a New Zealand RNZEME Workshop, including;
 HQ and Orderly Room
 Production Cell
 MT Section
 GE Section
 Tels Section
 Instrument Section
 Trade Repair Section
 Quartermaster Section
 NZAOC Stores Section

41 Squadron RNZAF

41 Squadron RNZAF Originally deployed to RAF Changi in Singapore as part of an expansion of New Zealand's commitment to the Commonwealth Far East Strategic Reserve in 1955 and was equipped with four Bristol Freighters. From 1971 a flight equipped with Bell UH-1 Iroquois helicopters joined 41 Squadron.

In December 1977 41 Squadron returned to New Zealand and disbanded during December 1977. Following the disbandment of the unit, its Iroquois aircraft remained in Singapore as Support Unit Singapore.

Support Unit Singapore/141 Flight RNZAF
Support Unit Singapore, which was renamed No. 141 Flight RNZAF in 1985 to recognise its 41 Squadron origins. This flight was disbanded in 1989, ending the permanent presence of RNZAF units in South East Asia.}

Education
To support the Force and dependants NZFORSEA maintained a number of educational facility's:

NZ Force Library
The NZ force Library consisted if two library's:
Dieppe Barracks, which served 1 RNZIR and 141 Flight
Sembawang Library, which was both a school and community Library

NZ Force Playgroup
NZ Force Playgroup was run by mothers and catered for children 0–3 years

NZ Force Preschool
NZ Force Playgroup for children 3–5 years

NZ Force School
The NZ Force School traced its roots back to the 1960s when 1 RNZIR was based in Terendak Camp in Malaysia. Up to 1974 schooling for NZ dependants was provided in combined Australian/United Kingdom and New Zealand Schools at Woodlands, Changi, Tengah and Sembawang. In 1976 the school came under New Zealand Department of Education regulations. By 1981 all the schools were centralised at Sembawang. Schooling was provided for New Zealand dependants, from infant classes to Form 7 (year 13).

Welfare and Recreation
NZFORSEA provided soldiers and dependants many welfare and recreational activities, including:
NZ Force Triathlon Team
NZ Force Tennis club
NZ Force Squash Club
Tigers Rugby club
NZ Force Soccer club
NZ Force Runners club
NZ Force Taekwondo
Kiwi Woman's Bowling League
Neptune Swimming club
NZ Force Theatre club
NZ Force Scouts and Guides

Dress Distinctions

NZ Army personnel posted to NZFORSEA wore the following dress distinctions:
NZ Flash – NZ Flash was affixed to each shoulder epaulette.

Kiwis – NZ Army posted to NZFORSEA wore a Kiwi patch on each shoulder, except for 1 RNZIR personnel who only wore the Kiwi patch on the right shoulder.

See also
 Military history of New Zealand
 Military history of New Zealand in Malaysia
 New Zealand in the Vietnam War
 Military history of Australia during the Vietnam War
 Military Reenactment Society of New Zealand
 ANZUK

References

Further reading
  Ian McGibbon (Ed.), (2000). The Oxford Companion to New Zealand Military History.

External links
 Final report by the medallic recognition joint working group on service in SEA 1950 TO 2011
 Malayan Emergency
 History Net Vietnam War
 Govt The Vietnam War
 NZ DSU Singapore
 ANZ Military Brats Singapore
 South East Asia Veterans Organisation
 RNZIR Sngapore 1987
 The New Zealand Defence Force Website
 Vietnam War Bibliography: Australia and New Zealand

Military units and formations of the New Zealand Army
Military units and formations established in 1974
Military units and formations disestablished in 1989
New Zealand